Alfonzo is a given name and surname. Notable people with the name include:

Surname
Alfredo Armas Alfonzo (1921–1990), Venezuelan writer, critic, editor and historian
Carlos Alfonzo, Cuban-American painter
DeJuan Alfonzo (born 1977), American football wide receiver/linebacker
Edgardo Alfonzo a.k.a. "Fonzie" (born 1973), Major League Baseball infielder
Eliézer Alfonzo (born 1979), professional baseball catcher
José Luis Alfonzo (born 1961), Argentinian film actor
Juan Pablo Perez Alfonzo (1903–1979), Venezuelan diplomat, politician and lawyer

Given name
Alfonzo Dennard (born 1989), American football cornerback
Luis Alfonzo García (born 1978), professional baseball first baseman
Alfonzo Giordano (1937–2013), senior ranking officer in the Philadelphia Police Department, convicted of accepting bribes
Luis Alfonzo Larrain (1911–1996), Venezuelan composer, music director and producer
Alfonzo Ratliff or Alfonso Ratliff (born 1956), American boxer
Alfonzo Sturzenegger (1888–1949), American football and baseball player and coach

See also
Afono
Alfoz
Alonzo (disambiguation)